Galius Kličius  (born 10 May 1950 in Vilnius, Lithuania) is a Lithuanian painter, cinematographer, and theatrical designer.

His film art direction credits include productions by BBC Classical Music Television, Showtime Networks, USA Networks, and Company Pictures.

Awards and nominations

See also
List of Lithuanian painters

References
This article was initially translated from the Lithuanian Wikipedia.

Lithuanian painters
1950 births
Living people
Artists from Vilnius